Georgios Moraitinis (born 1892, date of death unknown) was a Greek sport shooter. He  competed in the 1920 Summer Olympics and in the 1924 Summer Olympics.

Career
Moraitinis was born in Egypt.

In 1920, he won the silver medal as member of the Greek team in the team 30 metre military pistol event.

In the 1920 Summer Olympics he also participated in the following events:

 Team 50 metre free pistol - fourth place
 Team free rifle - 13th place
 300 metre free rifle, three positions - result unknown

Four years later at the 1924 Summer Olympics he participated in the following events:

 Team free rifle - twelfth place
 25 metre rapid fire pistol - 37th place
 50 metre rifle, prone - 58th place

References

External links
profile

1892 births
Greek male sport shooters
ISSF pistol shooters
ISSF rifle shooters
Olympic shooters of Greece
Shooters at the 1920 Summer Olympics
Shooters at the 1924 Summer Olympics
Olympic silver medalists for Greece
Year of death unknown
Olympic medalists in shooting
Medalists at the 1920 Summer Olympics
20th-century Greek people